Kang Nung-su (February 21, 1930 – July 21, 2015) was a North Korean literary critic and politician. He was a vice premier and member of the politburo of the Central Committee of the Workers' Party of Korea. He was a delegate to the 12th and 13th sessions of the Supreme People’s Assembly.

Career
Kang was born in 1930 in Pyongyang, in Korea under Japanese occupation. He graduated from the Korean literature department of Kim Il-sung University. In March 1973, he became head of the authors' delegation as deputy chair of the central committee of the Korean Writers’ Union, and visited the USSR. In February 1986, he became a vice-president of the Korea Literary Production Company, and in 1989 he became president of the April 15th Literature League and vice-chairman of the Reunification Literature Department of the Korean Writers' Union.

From September 1999 to September 2003, he served as Minister of Culture in the Cabinet of North Korea, and in August 2000 he became chair of the Korea Public Information Committee. In February 2004, he served as chair of the Kimilsungia-Kimjongilia Committee, and in March 2006, he served as deputy chair of the North Korean committee for implementation of the June 15th North–South Joint Declaration.

In June 2006, he was again appointed Minister of Culture, and was retained in this position in April 2009 and through January 2010. In February 2010, he served as head of the Film Department of the WPK Central Committee, and as chair of the National Film Committee. In June 2010 he was appointed vice premier of the North Korean cabinet.

In September 2010, he was appointed a member of the Central Committee of the Workers' Party of Korea.

Kang served as a member of the national mourning committees for Ri In Mo in 2007, Kim Jung-rin in 2010, and Kim Jong-il in 2011.

Delegate to Supreme People’s Assembly
In September 2003, Kang became a delegate to the 11th session of the Supreme People’s Assembly (SPA), and he served until April 2008 as vice-chair of the SPA. In April 2009, he became a delegate to the 12th SPA.

Awards
In August 1997, he received the Order of Kim Il-sung.

Works
 문학의 기초 (1966)
 시대와 문학 (1991)

References

External links
 Korea Institute for National Unification biographical information for key North Korean figures, 2010 

1930 births
2015 deaths
People from Pyongyang
North Korean politicians
North Korean literature
Kim Il-sung University alumni